Nadwan is a small town located in Barh Block,   Patna district, Bihar state, India. It lies near National Highway 83, and has a railway station named Nadwan railway station on Patna–Gaya line of East Central Railway zone.

Education 
Around 60 years ago, the villagers of Nadwan opened a school (now known as Middle School and High School Nadwan). This school has produced many doctors, engineers, and scientists. This village also has a college, K P S College Nadwan, This is the main source of poor villagers for doing their graduation and post-graduation.

Many educational institutions have moved to this village, and Doon Public School (http://dphspatna.com) opened a branch.

References 

Villages in Patna district